The Wing Heli was a helicopter wing in the Air Component of the Belgian Armed Forces.

Mission
The mission of the Wing Heli is to intervene in order to provide aid to the nation, urgent humanitarian aid and armed support on the national territory, to evacuate Belgian nationals from areas of crisis and to participate in peacekeeping operations.

Equipment

Agusta A109
Alouette II (retired from service in September 2009)

Battle honours
The standard of the Wing Heli bears the following battle honours:
Campaign 1914-1918
Yser 1917
Flanders 1918
Antwerp-Liège-Namur

These battle honours were obtained by the 6th Reconnaissance Squadron during the First World War. This standard was presented to the Belgian Army Light Aviation by King Baudouin I on 17 May 1979.
On September 9, 2010, Wing Heli was disbanded and the standard was handed over to the Competence Centre Air. The A109BAs moved to Beauvechain to become 1st Wing.

Endnotes

External links
Section of the website of the Belgian Ministry of Defence about the Wing Heli

Heli
Grâce-Hollogne